was a village located in Higashitonami District, Toyama Prefecture, Japan.

As of 2003, the village had an estimated population of 1,322 and a density of 14.06 persons per km². The total area was 94.02 km².

On November 1, 2004, Taira, along with the towns of Fukuno, Inami and Jōhana, the villages of Inokuchi, Kamitaira and Toga (all from Higashitonami District), and the town of Fukumitsu (from Nishitonami District), was merged to create the city of Nanto.

References

External links
 Nanto City official website (in English)

Dissolved municipalities of Toyama Prefecture
Nanto, Toyama